Alfoz de Lloredo is a municipality located in the autonomous community of Cantabria, Spain. According to the 2007 census, the city has a population of 2.538 inhabitants. Its capital is Novales.

Towns
La Busta
Cóbreces
Cigüenza
Novales (capital)
Oreña
Rudagüera
Toñanes

References

External links

Municipalities in Cantabria